Esra Gündar (born 23 May 1980) is a Turkish female handballer who plays for Yenimahalle Bld. SK and the Turkish national team.

She played for T.M.O. Ankara (1997–2003), Havelsan SK (2004–2006), Çankaya Belediyespor (2007–2008) and Maliye Milli Piyango SK (2008–2011) before she transferred in 2014 to Yenimahalle Bld. SK.

References 

1980 births
Sportspeople from Ankara
Turkish female handball players
Üsküdar Belediyespor players
Yenimahalle Bld. SK (women's handball) players
Living people
Mediterranean Games silver medalists for Turkey
Competitors at the 2009 Mediterranean Games
Mediterranean Games medalists in handball
21st-century Turkish women